Manuel Alvarez was a member of the Arizona State Senate from 2009 through 2011. He was elected to the Senate in November 2008, and served one term.  In his bid for re-election, he was defeated in the 2010 election by Gail Griffin.  Prior to his service in the Senate, Alvarez served in the U.S. Army from 1962 to 1965.

References

Democratic Party Arizona state senators
Living people
Year of birth missing (living people)